Vilanova de la Barca (Officially and in Catalan) is a municipality in the comarca of Segrià in Catalonia, Spain. It is situated at the confluence of the Segre and Corb rivers. The Urgell canal provides irrigation water for growing cereals and forage plants. The municipality is linked to Lleida and Balaguer by the C-1313 road and a FGC railroad.

Demography

References

 Panareda Clopés, Josep Maria; Rios Calvet, Jaume; Rabella Vives, Josep Maria (1989). Guia de Catalunya, Barcelona: Caixa de Catalunya.  (Spanish).  (Catalan).

External links
Official website 
 Government data pages 

Municipalities in Segrià
Populated places in Segrià